The Piccadilly electoral ward of Manchester City Council was created by the Local Government Boundary Commission for England to replace parts of the City Centre and Ancoats & Clayton wards in 2018.

It is represented in Westminster by Lucy Powell Labour Co-op MP for Manchester Central.

Councillors 
The ward is represented by three councillors on the city council. The first councillors for the new ward were elected in the local elections 2018; the candidate with the most votes receiving a 4-year term, second-most votes a 2-year term and third-most votes a 1-year term. From 2019 the council returns to electing one-third of councillors at each election.

 indicates seat up for election.

Elections in 2020s 
* denotes incumbent councillor seeking re-election.

May 2021

Elections in 2010s

May 2019

May 2018

References



Manchester City Council Wards